In 1929 the Brennabor Ideal Typ N was introduced by the Brennabor company, which for much of that decade had been Germany's leading auto maker.

The car replaced the Brennabor Typ Z which had been in production for only a year. The new model had its four-cylinder engine increased in size to 1.64 litres. In this application a maximum power output of 30 hp at 3,200 rpm was claimed.

In 1931 the introduction of the Brennabor Ideal Extra Typ N marked a further upgrade of what was now (following the introduction in that year of the smaller Brennabor Typ C 4/20) the middle model in the company's three model range. The "Extra" retained the 1.64-litre engine, but features a slightly longer and wider body. The choice of bodies was also extended with the inclusion in the range of a six-seater "touring car" body which in fact shared the larger chassis and body work of the company's six-cylinder Juwel 6 model.

By 1933, when the company was forced by economic conditions to cease car production, approximately 10,000 of the Ideal Typ N and Ideal Extra Typ N models had been built.

Technical details

Sources 
 Werner Oswald: Deutsche Autos 1920–1945. Motorbuch Verlag Stuttgart, 10. Auflage (1996), 

Brennabor vehicles
Motorcycles introduced in the 1920s